Dammur is a town in Northern Karnataka, India. It is few hours from North of Bangalore city in Midwest/Central region of India. It is located near Hampi known for rich history, Heritage, Oldest temples and Ancient architecture in India dating back to 1CE. Hampi is the most historic visited place in the world.

See also
 Hampi
Bellary
Bangalore
Karnataka

References

External links
 
 http://www.karnataka.com/hampi/
 http://hampi.in
 http://www.tripadvisor.com/Tourism-g319725-Hampi_Karnataka-Vacations.html
 http://Bellary.nic.in/

Villages in Bellary district